Kenny Robertson (born ) is an American former basketball player, known for his collegiate career at Cleveland State University in the late 1980s. From 1986 to 1990, Robertson set his mark as one of NCAA Division I men's basketball all-time steals leaders. Through 2020–21 he remains #15 all-time in Division I career steals with 341. He was the country's steals per game leader as a junior in 1988–89 with 3.96 per game, and he set Summit League single game (12) and career steals totals.

He finished his career at Cleveland State with 892 points, 339 rebounds, 420 assists, and 341 steals.

See also
 List of NCAA Division I men's basketball players with 11 or more steals in a game
 List of NCAA Division I men's basketball season steals leaders
 List of NCAA Division I men's basketball career steals leaders

References

1960s births
Living people
Basketball players from Ohio
Cleveland State Vikings men's basketball players
Guards (basketball)
People from Barberton, Ohio